Marcus Christer Rohdén (born 11 May 1991) is a Swedish professional footballer who plays as a midfielder for Serie B club Frosinone. Beginning his career with IF Elfsborg in 2011, he won Allsvenskan and Svenska Cupen with the club before moving to F.C. Crotone and Serie A in 2016. In 2019, he signed with Frosinone. A full international since 2015, he has won 16 caps for the Sweden national team and represented his country at the 2018 FIFA World Cup.

Club career
Rohdén started his career in Hössna IF and moved to IF Elfsborg as a 16-year-old signing a youth contract. In December 2011 Marcus signed a senior contract with IF Elfsborg on a five-year deal after returning from a loan at Skövde AIK. He scored his first goal in Allsvenskan against BK Häcken on 26 August 2012, in his debut season in both Elfsborg and Allsvenskan.

On 3 August 2016, Rohdén signed for Serie A newcomers Crotone.

On 13 August 2019, Rohdén was announced as a Frosinone player.

International career
Rohdén represented the Sweden U17 and U21 teams before making his full international debut for Sweden on 15 January 2015 in a friendly 2–0 win against the Ivory Coast. He also scored his first international goal in the same match. He made his competitive debut for Sweden in a 2018 FIFA World Cup qualifier against the Netherlands, playing for 77 minutes before being replaced by Emir Kujovic in a 1–1 draw.

In May 2018 he was named in Sweden's 23 man squad for the 2018 FIFA World Cup in Russia. He remained on the bench in all five games as Sweden reached the quarter-finals in a FIFA World Cup for the first time since 1994.

Career statistics

Club

International

 Scores and results list Sweden's goal tally first, score column indicates score after each Rohdén goal.

Honours 
Elfsborg
Allsvenskan: 2012
Svenska Cupen: 2012-13

References

External links

1991 births
Living people
People from Ulricehamn Municipality
Association football midfielders
Swedish footballers
Sweden youth international footballers
Sweden under-21 international footballers
Sweden international footballers
Swedish expatriate footballers
Allsvenskan players
Serie A players
Serie B players
IF Elfsborg players
Skövde AIK players
F.C. Crotone players
Frosinone Calcio players
Expatriate footballers in Italy
Swedish expatriate sportspeople in Italy
2018 FIFA World Cup players
Sportspeople from Västra Götaland County